Sekolah Menengah Kebangsaan Datin Onn Jaafar (SMKDOJ) is better known as DOJ or Pesta by most of the residents in Batu Pahat, and was established in early 1977. The first schooling session started on 1 January 1978.

It is located in Batu Pahat on a land area of 10 acres (4 hectares). The school began construction in early 1977 and was completed in the same year.

The school was previously named as Sekolah Rendah Bandar Penggaram. The name was later changed to Sekolah Menengah Datin Halimah in commemoration of the wife of former Menteri Besar, Johor Dato Onn Jaafar, father of the third Prime Minister of Malaysia, Tun Hussein Onn,. However, the PM's wife disagreed with this and it was later changed to Sekolah Menengah Kebangsaan Datin Onn Jaafar, a name it still retains.

SMK Datin Onn Jaafar was formally opened on 1 September 1977 by former Malaysian Prime Minister, Tun Dr. Mahathir bin Mohammad, when he  was Minister of Education.

See also
 Education in Malaysia

1978 establishments in Malaysia
Batu Pahat District
Educational institutions established in 1978
Secondary schools in Malaysia
Schools in Johor